The Hotel St. George was once one of Wellington, New Zealand's top hotels and a prominent building.

Overview 

Originally located in what was Wellington's medical consulting quarter where it met the prime retail district at the junction of Willis and Boulcott Streets the hotel's main entrance was in Boulcott Street, the bars were entered from Willis Street. It was briefly the country's largest hotel. The hotel was designed by architect William Prouse and built in 1929-30 of steel framed reinforced concrete at a cost of A£100,000, and is one of the city's Art Deco buildings. The site had previously been taken by the Union Bank whose building was converted about 1877 into the Albert or "Old Identities" Hotel by early Wellington settler John Plimmer (after whom the suburb of Plimmerton is named). "Old Identities" because about 1880 the exterior wall was decorated with sculpted heads of early local notables.

The hotel was widely regarded as the capital city's top hotel, and played host to many events in its Palm Lounge. After the 1942 entry of USA into World War II its accommodation was briefly seconded by US Marines and it featured with them in the 1957 movie Until They Sail. It played host to The Beatles during their 1964 tour (when they stayed in what is now room's 601 and 602), and was the first choice hotel for visiting dignitaries for many years, from royalty to international rugby teams. The hotel was also host to the inaugural New Zealand national science fiction convention in 1979, and was also a venue for the convention in 1980 and 1987. In October 2012, The Bootleg Beatles re-enacted the Beatles performance with a concert from the hotel's balcony.

The hotel consists of 8 floors, with 84 single rooms with ensuites, 42 single rooms with shared ensuites, 80 single rooms with no ensuite and 26 shared rooms.

It has a Category II listing with Heritage New Zealand.

Festival of The Arts late night venue

In 1992 the third floor was used as an entertainment venue, for late night shows after the main performances around Wellington city. Many well known musicians from around New Zealand turned up to play in their own bands, or spontaneously created 'jam' bands. the television sets from all the unused rooms (the entire third floor) were arranged in an array, and computer graphics shown.

The Queen is believed to have visited the hotel when she was touring New Zealand. Her youngest son, Prince Edward, Earl of Wessex, worked as a house tutor and junior master for two terms in September 1982 at Wanganui Collegiate School.

Student accommodation
The hotel has been used since 1995 as a student hostel first for Wellington Polytechnic Massey University in Wellington and then from 2006 for Victoria University for much of the year, and is that university's second-largest hostel, housing 232 students. It still serves as a hotel during the summer university recess.

The Hotel St George underwent major renovations in 2005 and continued to be upgraded well into 2006.

Renovations continued throughout the entire year of 2007, even though management had said at the beginning of the year that builders would be gone within two weeks.

In late September, the sewage pipes leaked, causing fecal matter to leak into room 309, and onto the balconies of most floors. As a result, 309 was unusable, and the carpet was stripped and the room uninhabited for the rest of 2007.

In 2007, the hostel was managed by Mark Tuohoro. The managing company, EdPac, underwent significant financial problems which at one point meant Victoria University of Wellington's Accommodation Services staff sent letters to 2007 residents telling them that they were unsure if the hostel would remain open until the end of the year. EdPac declared bankruptcy at the end of the year, and the management of the hostel was overtaken by the university itself to ensure the 2008 intake of students would have accommodation.

Hotel St George was the most expensive of Victoria University of Wellington's student hostels, with the cheapest rate (for a shared room with a shared ensuite) $225 per week, up to $270 per week for a private room with a private ensuite. There were eight floors in the hotel, and three floors in the Annex. The eighth floor was designated a girls' floor.

In early 2008, Victoria University of Wellington secured the lease for the St George Hotel building, and the Annex building. The hall itself became known as "St George Hall". The university was able to successfully change the image that St George had gained over the years, even though it still suffered from some of the problems that EdPAC left behind. At the time, St George Hall had eight staff members. It had a Residential Manager, Office Administrator, and six Residential Advisors, with the cleaning and catering contracted out to independent companies.

In 2009, Victoria University of Wellington decided not to renew the lease of the St. George Hall, after the building was found not to meet modern earthquake codes. The year saw many false fire alarms and leaking roof in the 2nd floor common room. Since then, it has been owned by the Prime Property Group.

References

External links 

 Official site
 Wellington Heritage Walk
 Turnbull Library photograph of the hotel, circa 1930
 Photograph of the hotel circa 1965

Art Deco architecture in New Zealand
Heritage New Zealand Category 2 historic places in the Wellington Region
Victoria University of Wellington
Hotels in Wellington City
1930s architecture in New Zealand